The Ciutat Esportiva Dani Jarque is the training ground of the Primera Division club RCD Espanyol and home of RCD Espanyol B and RCD Espanyol Femenino. Located in Sant Adrià de Besòs, it was opened in 2001.

Overview
Occupying an area of  60,000 m² near Barcelona, the training centre was inaugurated in 2001 as Ciutat Esportiva del RCD Espanyol, but soon was popularly known as Sarrià, in reference to the historic stadium of RCD Espanyol Estadi de Sarrià. However, on 21 January 2012, the club president Ramon Condal announced that the centre was officially renamed as Ciutat Esportiva Dani Jarque in memory of the late Espanyol captain Dani Jarque.

The centre is accessible via the following routes:
Metro: La Pau (L4 o L2), Verneda (L4).
Bus: 44, 43, 42, B-21, B-23, B-25.
Car direction Besós Ronda Litoral: Exit 26 (Sant Adrià, Port Fòrum Sant Adrià, La Mina, Llull).
Car direction Llobregat Ronda Litorial: Exit 29 (Verneda, Sant Adrià, Rambla Guipúscoa).

Facilities

Ciutat Esportiva Stadium (107 x 68 meters) with a capacity of 1,520 seats, is the home stadium of RCD Espanyol B, the reserve team of RCD Espanyol. It is also home to the club's youth sides and the women's team.
1 natural grass field (107 x 68 meters).
2 artificial fields (90 x 63.5 meters each).
7 mini fields with artificial pitch (60 x 33 meters each).
Goalkeepers-designated natural grass training field.
Multi Sports activities field of artificial grass.
Service centre with gymnasium, restaurant, etc.
Parking lot with a capacity of 150 cars.

References

External links
The centre's page at RCDE official website
Estadios de España 

RCD Espanyol
Dani Jarque
Sports venues completed in 2001